Euphonias are members of the genus Euphonia, a group of Neotropical birds in the finch family. They and the chlorophonias comprise the subfamily Euphoniinae.

The genus name is of Greek origin and refers to the birds' pleasing song, meaning "sweet-voiced" ( eu means "well" or "good" and  phōnē means "sound", hence "of good sound").

Most male euphonias are dark metallic blue above and bright yellow below. Many have contrasting pale foreheads and white undertails. Some have light blue patches on the head and/or orangish underparts. Females much more plain, predominantly olive-green all over. They eat small fruit and berries, particularly mistletoe (Loranthaceae). Some species may also eat some insects.

Euphonias were once considered members of the tanager family, Thraupidae. A molecular phylogenetic study of the finch family Fringillidae published in 2012 included 9 species from the genus Euphonia and a single species from the genus Chlorophonia, the blue-naped chlorophonia. The resulting cladogram showed the blue-naped chlorophonia nested within the Euphonia clade implying that the genus Euphonia is paraphyletic.
The genus was introduced in 1806 by the French zoologist Anselme Gaëtan Desmarest in his Histoire naturelle des tangaras, des manakins et des todiers with the white-vented euphonia as the type species.

A taxonomic analysis published in 2020 found that the genus Euphonia was paraphyletic with respect to Chlorophonia. To resolve the paraphyly the authors of the study proposed the resurrection of the genus Cyanophonia that had been introduced in 1851 by Charles Lucien Bonaparte. They suggested that the Antillean euphonia (Cyanophonia musica) should be the type species. The proposed genus would contain three species: the Antillean euphonia, the golden-rumped euphonia and the elegant euphonia. An alternative and simpler way to resolve the paraphyly would be move the three species from Euphonia into Chlorophonia, which has been followed by the IOC.

Species list
The genus contains 24 species:

The black-throated euphonia ("Euphonia vittata") is now thought to be a hybrid between the chestnut-bellied euphonia and the orange-bellied euphonia.

References

External links

Euphonia videos, photos and sounds on the Internet Bird Collection

 
Euphoniinae
Bird genera